Helmstedt – Wolfsburg is an electoral constituency (German: Wahlkreis) represented in the Bundestag. It elects one member via first-past-the-post voting. Under the current constituency numbering system, it is designated as constituency 51. It is located in southeastern Lower Saxony, comprising the city of Wolfsburg, the district of Helmstedt, and part of the district of Gifhorn.

Helmstedt – Wolfsburg was created for the inaugural 1949 federal election. Since 2017, it has been represented by Falko Mohrs of the Social Democratic Party (SPD). Mohrs resigned in 2022, to join the Second Weil cabinet.

Geography
Helmstedt – Wolfsburg is located in southeastern Lower Saxony. As of the 2021 federal election, it comprises the independent city of Wolfsburg, the district of Helmstedt, and the Samtgemeinden of Boldecker Land and Brome and the Giebel area from the Gifhorn district.

History
Helmstedt – Wolfsburg was created in 1949, then known as Braunschweig-Land – Helmstedt. It acquired its current name in the 1965 election. In the inaugural Bundestag election, it was Lower Saxony constituency 29 in the numbering system. From 1953 through 1961, it was number 51. From 1965 through 1998, it was number 46. In the 2002 and 2005 elections, it was number 51. In the 2009 election, it was number 52. Since the 2013 election, it has been number 51.

Originally, the constituency comprised the district of Helmstedt and the now-abolished Landkreis Braunschweig district without the Samtgemeinde of Thedinghausen. In the 1965 through 1972 elections, it comprised the independent city of Wolfsburg and the districts of Helmtedt and Landkreis Braunschweig, again excluding Thedinghausen. In the 1976 election, it comprised Wolfsburg, Helmstedt, and the municipality of Cremlingen and Samtgemeinde of Sickte from the district of Wolfenbüttel. In the 1980 through 1998 elections, it comprised the city of Wolfsburg and district of Helmstedt. It acquired its current borders in the 2002 election.

Members
The constituency was first held by Hermann Troppenz of the Social Democratic Party (SPD), who served from 1949 to 1953. Alfred Burgemeister of the Christian Democratic Union (CDU) won in 1953 and served until 1969. Rudolf Hauck of the SPD then served until 1983, when Volkmar Köhler of the CDU won the constituency. Fellow party member Heinrich-Wilhelm Ronsöhr served from 1994 to 1998. In 1998, SPD candidate Bodo Seidenthal regained the constituency, and served a single term. He was succeeded by Hans-Jürgen Uhl, who was elected in 2002 and 2005. Günter Lach of the CDU served from 2009 to 2017. Falko Mohrs has been representative since the 2017 election.

Election results

2021 election

2017 election

2013 election

2009 election

References

Federal electoral districts in Lower Saxony
1949 establishments in West Germany
Constituencies established in 1949